Karin Anna Cheung (born November 2, 1974) is an American actress, singer, songwriter, and artist.

Early life and education 
Cheung was born on November 2, 1974, in Los Angeles, California. In 1998, she graduated from California State University, Northridge, with a degree in art.

Career 
Cheung's first audition for feature films landed her the female lead role as Stephanie Vandergosh in Better Luck Tomorrow (2002) directed by Justin Lin. She also plays the lead, Angela, in Quentin Lee's feature film The People I've Slept With (2009). In 2012, Cheung voice acted as the lead role of Kaz Suyeishi in the animated short film Hibakusha, directed by Steve Nguyen and Choz Belen. Cheung also appeared in Quentin Lee's horror film, The Unbidden, alongside Michelle Krusiec, Tamlyn Tomita and Julia Nickson-Soul.

Cheung was a featured singer at Barack Obama’s presidential inauguration on January 20, 2009.

Filmography

Film

References

External links 
 

1974 births
Living people
Artists from Los Angeles
Actresses from Los Angeles
American actresses of Chinese descent
American women singer-songwriters
American film actresses
American television actresses
California State University, Northridge alumni
21st-century American singers
21st-century American women singers